Chicualacuala is a town located in the province of Gaza in Mozambique.  The town is better known by this unofficial name (and the name of the district to which the town belongs) than by its official toponym Vila Eduardo Mondlane.

History 
The colonial name of the town was Malvérnia.

Chicualacuala had a turbulent history with attacks from Rhodesia on numerous occasions because it is the site of a key tropo-spheric communication.  The town is located at an important crossing point near the border.

Geography 
Nearby towns and villages include Nyala (8.5 nm), Samo (14.2 nm), Cherilele (6.3 nm), Benibueni (6.7 nm) and
Sambula (21.4 nm).

Transport 

The railway systems of Zimbabwe and Mozambique meet at this town and the railway station is part of the Limpopo railway.  The station is paired with the Zimbabwe station of Sango.

See also 
 Railway stations in Mozambique
 Railway stations in Zimbabwe

References 

Chicuacuala District
Mozambique–Zimbabwe border crossings
Populated places in Gaza Province